Stafford, California may refer to:
Stafford, Humboldt County, California
Stafford, Sutter County, California, historic name of a hamlet now superseded by Live Oak, Sutter County, California